The 2001 Tour de Pologne was the 58th edition of the Tour de Pologne cycle race l. It was held from 3 September to 9 September 2001. The race started in Gdańsk and finished in Karpacz. The race was won by Ondřej Sosenka.

General classification

References

2001
Tour de Pologne
September 2001 sports events in Europe